The IPSC Danish Handgun Championships are IPSC level 3 championships held once a year by the Danish Sport Shooting Association.

Champions 
The following is a list of previous and current champions.

Overall category

References 

IPSC Champions - Jack Romer Blog
Danish IPSC Championships, Revolver and Standard 2014
Danish IPSC Championships, Open and Production 2014
Danish IPSC Championships, Open and Production 2015
Danish IPSC Championships, Classic, Revolver and Standard 2015
Danish IPSC Championships, Open and Production 2016
Danish IPSC Championships, Classic, Revolver and Standard 2016

IPSC shooting competitions
National shooting championships
Shooting competitions in Denmark